I Don't Speak the Language is the debut album by Matthew Wilder. It was released in 1983 on Private-I/Epic, and is notable for the hit single "Break My Stride".

Track listing
 "Break My Stride" (Matthew Wilder, Greg Prestopino) - 3:04
 "The Kid's American" (1983) (Wilder) - 4:36
 "I Don't Speak the Language" (Wilder, Barbara Hyde) - 4:45
 "Love Above the Ground Floor" (Wilder, Prestopino) - 4:13
 "World of the Rich and Famous" (Wilder, Roscoe Beck) - 4:43
 "Ladder of Lovers" (Wilder, Prestopino) - 4:04
 "I Was There" (Wilder) - 3:01
 "Dreams Keep Bringing You Back" (Wilder, Prestopino) - 4:36
 "I Don't Speak the Language"  (Reprise) - 1:20

Personnel 

 Matthew Wilder – lead vocals (1-9), backing vocals (1, 2, 4, 5, 6, 8), Prophet-5 (1), Prophet-10 (2, 3, 5, 6, 9), acoustic piano, (4, 7, 8), horn arrangements (4), Rhodes Chroma (5)
 Bill Elliott – Prophet-5 (1), acoustic piano (2), Prophet-10 (3, 4, 6, 7, 9), horn arrangements (4)
 Bill Cuomo – Prophet-5 (3, 6, 8, 9), Rhodes Chroma (3, 5, 6, 8, 9)
 Paul Fox – E-mu Emulator (5, 7)
 Dennis Herring – guitar (1, 2, 7)
 Donald Griffin – guitar (4, 5)
 Tim Weston – guitar solo (5)
 John McFee – mandolin (8)
 Reggie McBride – bass (2, 5)
 Rick Chudacoff – bass (4, 6, 7)
 Alphonso Johnson – bass (8)
 Peter Bunetta – drums (1-9), percussion (1), Oberheim DMX (1)
 John Gilston – Simmons drum programming (1-9)
 Paulinho da Costa – percussion (3, 6, 8, 9)
 Jerry Peterson – baritone saxophone (2)
 Lon Price – tenor saxophone (2)
 Bill Armstrong – trumpet (4)
 Gary Grant – trumpet (4)
 Greg Prestopino – backing vocals (1, 2, 8)
 Joe Turano – backing vocals (1, 2, 7, 8)
 Arno Lucas – backing vocals (2, 5)
 Leslie Smith – backing vocals (2, 5)
 Dee Dee Bellson – backing vocals (3, 4, 9)
 Mary Hylan – backing vocals (3, 4, 9)
 Edie Lehmann – backing vocals (3, 4, 9)
 Amy Weston – backing vocals (3, 4, 9)
 Anna Pagan – backing vocals (5)
 Anita Sherman – backing vocals (5)

Production 
 Producers – Peter Bunetta, Rick Chudacoff and Bill Elliott.
 Executive Producers – Al Bunetta and Shingo Take
 Engineers – Csaba Pectoz (Track 1); Steve Zaretsky (All tracks).
 Assistant Engineers – Britt Bacon and Michael Franke (Track 1); Paul Ericksen, Mitch Gibson and Csaba Pectoz (Tracks 2-9).
 Mixed by Steve Zaretsky 
 Design – Tommy Steele and Art Hotel
 Photography – William Warner

Charts

References

1983 debut albums
Matthew Wilder albums
Epic Records albums